Lenny Loic Nangis (born 24 March 1994) is a Guadeloupean professional footballer who plays as a winger for  club Nancy. Nangis was a France youth international having represented his nation at under-16 and under-17 level.

Club career
On 19 August 2011, Nangis signed his first professional contract agreeing to a three-year deal. He was, subsequently, promoted to the senior team by manager Franck Dumas and assigned the number 15 shirt. Nangis made his professional debut on 31 August in a 3–2 Coupe de la Ligue victory over Brest appearing as a half-time substitute. On 1 August 2016, Nangis joined Bastia on a season-long loan deal. On 2 September 2017, he signed with Valenciennes for three years.

In July 2021, it was announced that Nangis had signed with Belgian club RWDM.

On 30 June 2022, Nangis signed a two-year contract with Nancy.

International career
Nangis played with the under-17 team at the 2011 FIFA U-17 World Cup scoring one goal.

On 23 March 2018, Nangis made his debut for the Guadeloupe national football team in a friendly 1–0 loss to Trinidad and Tobago.

References

External links
 
 
 
 
 
 
 
 

1994 births
Living people
Guadeloupean footballers
Guadeloupe international footballers
French footballers
France youth international footballers
France under-21 international footballers
French people of Guadeloupean descent
Association football forwards
Association football wingers
Ligue 1 players
Ligue 2 players
Super League Greece players
Challenger Pro League players
Stade Malherbe Caen players
Lille OSC players
SC Bastia players
Valenciennes FC players
Levadiakos F.C. players
Sarpsborg 08 FF players
RWDM47 players
AS Nancy Lorraine players
French expatriate footballers
Expatriate footballers in Greece
French expatriate sportspeople in Greece
Expatriate footballers in Norway
French expatriate sportspeople in Norway
Expatriate footballers in Belgium
French expatriate sportspeople in Belgium